Alberta Provincial Highway No. 32, commonly referred to as Highway 32, is a north–south highway in west–central Alberta, Canada. From north to south, Highway 32 begins at its junction with Highway 33 in the Town of Swan Hills. It proceeds south for  where it meets Highway 43 northwest of Whitecourt.

Major intersections 
From south to north:

References 

032
Whitecourt